The Seram small tree-nymph (Ideopsis klassika) is a species of nymphalid butterfly in the Danainae family. It is endemic to Seram, Indonesia.

References

Ideopsis
Butterflies of Indonesia
Endemic fauna of Seram Island
Butterflies described in 1909
Taxonomy articles created by Polbot